Agnieszka Cyl, née Grzybek (born February 28, 1984) is a  biathlete from Poland. She competed at the 2010 Winter Olympics in Vancouver. In the 15 km individual race, she placed 7th with a time of 42:32.5.

References
 Agnieszka Cyl at Vancouver2010.com; retrieved 2010-02-18.

External links
 

1984 births
Polish female biathletes
Living people
Biathletes at the 2010 Winter Olympics
Olympic biathletes of Poland
People from Jelenia Góra
Sportspeople from Lower Silesian Voivodeship
21st-century Polish women